Caetano Veloso (a.k.a. Álbum Branco, which means White Album, in Portuguese) is an album released in Brazil in 1969, being the third album by Caetano Veloso, his second solo.

The album vocals and acoustic guitars were recorded in a small recording studio in Salvador, where Veloso was confined for defying the authoritarian Brazilian government of the time. He recorded the vocals, and Gilberto Gil the acoustic guitar, which were sent to arranger and producer Rogério Duprat, who added layers of electric guitars, horns, bass, drums and other instruments in a more professional studio in São Paulo.

The album, like its predecessor, is very eclectic (a characteristic of the Tropicália movement), with songs that vary from Bossa Nova, Psychedelic rock, Carnival music, traditional Bahian music, Fado, Tango, and others. It has songs in Portuguese, Spanish, and English.

The song 'Alfomega' was sampled by MF DOOM on the Ghostface Killah track 'Charlie Brown' in 2006.

Track listing

Personnel
 Caetano Veloso - vocals
 Gilberto Gil - Violão, vocals on 12
 Lanny Gordin- electric guitar, acoustic guitar [Portuguese guitar]
 Sérgio Barroso - electric bass
 Wilson das Neves - drum set
 Chiquinho de Moraes - piano and organ
 Rogério Duprat - arrangements

References

1969 albums
Caetano Veloso albums
Philips Records albums
Spanish-language albums
Portuguese-language albums
Albums produced by Rogério Duprat